Polyester is a 1981 American comedy film directed, produced, and written by John Waters, and starring Divine, Tab Hunter, Edith Massey, and Mink Stole. It satirizes the melodramatic genre of women's pictures, particularly those directed by Douglas Sirk, whose work directly influenced this film, as well as a satire of suburban life in the early 1980s involving divorce, abortion, adultery, alcoholism, foot fetishism, and the religious right.

Polyester was filmed in Waters' native Baltimore, Maryland, as with many of his other films, and features a gimmick called Odorama, whereby viewers can smell what they see on screen using scratch and sniff cards, in a stylistic tribute to the work of William Castle, whose films typically featured attention-grabbing gimmicks.

Following Stunts, it was one of the first films that New Line Cinema produced.

Plot
Early 1980s housewife Francine Fishpaw watches her upper-middle-class family's life crumble in their suburban Baltimore home. Her husband Elmer is a polyester-clad lout who owns an adult movie theater, causing anti-pornography protesters to picket the Fishpaws' house. Francine's Christian beliefs are also offended by the behavior of her children—Lu-Lu, her spoiled, promiscuous daughter, and Dexter, her delinquent, glue-sniffing son who derives sexual pleasure from stomping on women's feet.

Francine's cocaine-snorting mother La Rue, a class-conscious snob, compounds her troubles by robbing her daughter blind, constantly deriding her obesity, and berating her for befriending her former housecleaner, Cuddles Kovinsky, a simple-minded woman who tries to console Francine with "seize-the-day" bromides and has inherited a large sum of money from a very wealthy former employer.

After Francine discovers Elmer having an affair with his secretary, Sandra Sullivan, she confronts them during a motel tryst and demands a divorce. Francine then falls into alcoholism and depression, exacerbated by her children's behavior: Lu-Lu is impregnated by her degenerate boyfriend Bo-Bo Belsinger and announces she is getting an abortion, and after Dexter is arrested at a supermarket for stomping on a woman's foot, the media reveal that he is the Baltimore Foot Stomper who has been serially attacking and terrorizing local women.

Lu-Lu goes to a clinic for an abortion, but anti-abortion picketers attack her. She returns home and tries to induce a miscarriage, causing Francine to call an unwed mothers' home. Two nuns transport Lu-Lu to a Catholic home. Bo-Bo and his friend, who have come to trash the Fishpaw house on Halloween night, shoot La Rue, but she retrieves the gun and shoots Bo-Bo dead. After Lu-Lu flees the unwed mothers' home, she returns home to find Bo-Bo's dead body and is so distraught that she attempts suicide. Francine comes home and faints after witnessing her daughter's suicide attempt—and the apparent suicide by hanging of the family dog, Bonkers, based on a suicide note left near the dog's dangling body.

Some time later, Francine's life begins to look up. Dexter is released from jail, having been rehabilitated. Lu-Lu suffers a miscarriage from her suicide attempt and is contrite about her past, becoming an artistic flower child who embraces macramé. Francine quits drinking, confronts and rebukes her mother, and finds new romance with Todd Tomorrow. Todd proposes marriage to an elated Francine, but she soon discovers that Todd and La Rue are romantically involved and conspiring to embezzle her divorce settlement, drive her insane and sell her children into prostitution.

Elmer and Sandra break into the house to murder Francine, but Dexter and Lu-Lu kill them: Dexter steps on Sandra's foot, causing her to accidentally shoot Elmer, and Lu-Lu uses her macramé to strangle Sandra. When Cuddles and her German chauffeur and fiancé Heintz arrive, their car runs over La Rue and Todd, killing them. The film concludes with a happy ending for Francine, her children, and newlyweds Cuddles and Heintz.

Cast

 Divine as Francine Fishpaw
 Tab Hunter as Todd Tomorrow
 David Samson as Elmer Fishpaw
 Edith Massey as Cuddles Kovinsky
 Mink Stole as Sandra Sullivan
 Ken King as Dexter Fishpaw
 Mary Garlington as Lu-Lu Fishpaw
 Joni Ruth White as La Rue
 Stiv Bators as Bo-Bo Belsinger
 Hans Kramm as Heintz
 Rick Breitenfeld as Dr. Arnold Quackenshaw
 Susan Lowe as Shirley Evans, mall victim
 Cookie Mueller as Betty Lalinski
 George Hulse as Principal Kirk
 Michael Watson as Freddy Ashton
 Mary Vivian Pearce and Sharon Niesp as Nuns
 Jean Hill as Gospel bus hijacker
 Leo Braudy as Abortion picketer
 Dorothy Braudy as Abortion picketer
 George Figgs as Abortion picketer
 Marina Melin as Supermarket Victim
 Chuck Yeaton as Hospital Reporter

Production

Waters' usual acting troupe, the Dreamlanders, serve minor roles in Polyester, compared to Waters' previous films Desperate Living, Female Trouble and Pink Flamingos, which starred several Dreamlanders in major roles. Only two, Divine and Edith Massey, receive top billing. This was also Massey's final collaboration with Waters before her 1984 death. Dreamlander perennials Mink Stole, Mary Vivian Pearce, Cookie Mueller, Sharon Niesp, Marina Melin, Susan Lowe and Jean Hill have plot integral roles; however, they are much smaller compared to earlier films. Principal photography took place over the course of three weeks in October 1980.

Polyester was the first Waters film to skirt the mainstream, even garnering an R rating (his previous films were all unrated or rated X—the equivalent of the Motion Picture Association of America's present-day NC-17 rating). The film is set in a middle-class Baltimore suburb instead of its slums and bohemian neighborhoods, the setting of Waters' earlier films.

During an interview on The Ghost of Hollywood, cinematographer David Insley revealed that the helicopter used to shoot the opening scenes had to make an emergency landing on a nearby golf course while it was open. After the helicopter was cleared for safety, it was subsequently towed from the fairway using a flatbed.

This was Insley's third collaboration with Waters and his first as lead cinematographer. He would go on to shoot Hairspray and Cry-Baby as well.

Music
Three songs are featured.
 "Polyester" by Tab Hunter – words and music by Chris Stein and Debbie Harry
 "Be My Daddy's Baby (Lu-Lu's Theme)" by Michael Kamen – words and music by Harry and Kamen
 "The Best Thing" by Bill Murray – words and music by Harry and Kamen

Women's pictures
Polyester was a send-up of women's pictures, an exploitative film genre popular from the 1950–60s and typically featured bored, unfulfilled, or otherwise troubled women, usually middle-aged suburban housewives, finding release or escape through the arrival of a handsome younger man. Women's pictures were typically hackneyed B-movies, but Waters specifically styled Polyester after the work of the director Douglas Sirk, asking Insley to make use of similar lighting and editing techniques, even using film equipment and movie-making techniques from Sirk's era. By chance, Insley was able to view some of Sirk's films at a local screening celebrating the director.

Odorama

Odors, especially Francine's particularly keen sense of smell, play an important role. To highlight this, Waters designed Odorama, a "scratch-and-sniff" gimmick inspired by the work of William Castle and the 1960 film Scent of Mystery, which featured a device called Smell-O-Vision. Special cards with spots numbered 1 through 10 were distributed to audience members before the show, in the manner of 3D glasses. When a number flashed on the screen, viewers were to scratch and sniff the appropriate spot. Smells included the scent of flowers, pizza, glue, gas, grass and feces. For the first DVD release the smell of glue was changed due to, as Waters states, "political correctness". The gimmick was advertised with the tag "It'll blow your nose!" After being prompted to scratch and sniff a bouquet of roses, viewers are subjected to a series of mostly foul-smelling odors, and thus fall victim to the director's prank.

The ten smells (developed by 3M per Waters in the supplements section of the DVD release) are:
 Roses
 Flatulence
 Model airplane glue
 Pizza
 Gasoline
 Skunk
 Natural gas
 New car smell
 Dirty shoes
 Air freshener

A video release omits the onscreen flashing numbers as well as the opening introduction explaining Odorama. This version, created by Lorimar-Telepictures, was shown on cable TV in the United States. The Independent Film Channel released reproduction Odorama cards for John Waters film festivals in 1999. Waters expressed his delight at having audiences actually "pay to smell shit" on the 2004 DVD release commentary track.

Paramount Pictures, producers of Rugrats Go Wild, used the Odorama name and logo in 2003, somewhat upsetting Waters when he learned that New Line Cinema had let the copyright lapse. The 2011 film Spy Kids: All the Time in the World uses a scratch and sniff card now called "Aromascope", which is advertised as providing the fourth dimension in its "4D" format. Polyester was re-screened by Midnight Movies at the Edinburgh International Film Festival in June 2011. The Odorama cards were recreated by Midnight Movies, Little Joe Magazine, and The Aroma Company to allow viewers to interact with the film as originally intended.

Critical response
Polyester received some positive reviews from the mainstream press. Said Janet Maslin of The New York Times:

On the review aggregator website Rotten Tomatoes, the film holds a score of 94% based on reviews from 31 critics, with an average rating of 7.1/10. The critics' consensus states, "As proudly tacky as its titular fabric, Polyester finds writer-director John Waters moving ever so slightly into the mainstream without losing any of his subversive charm.".

In popular culture
The 2000 single "Frontier Psychiatrist", by the Australian electronic music group The Avalanches, samples the film.

References

External links

 
 Polyester: The Perils of Francine an essay by Elena Gorfinkel at the Criterion Collection

1981 films
1980s black comedy films
American black comedy films
American independent films
American satirical films
Adultery in films
Films about abortion
Films about dysfunctional families
Films directed by John Waters
Films scored by Michael Kamen
Films set in Baltimore
Films shot in Baltimore
Films with scents
1981 comedy films
1980s English-language films
1980s American films